Alfred Jean-Baptiste Lemaire (15 January 1842 – 24 February 1907) was a French military musician and composer. He is known for teaching in the music department of Dar ul-Funun during the reign of King Nasser-al-Din Shah, and for composing the first Iranian national anthem.

Life
Lemaire was born in Aire-sur-la-Lys and entered the Paris Conservatory in 1855, graduating in flute and composition in 1863. By 1867 he had become Deputy Music Master for the Infantry of the Imperial Guard. When King Nasser-al-Din Shah visited Paris, he admired the French military bands that had welcomed him. At the time Iranian military music had used only traditional drums (naqareh) and trumpets (karnay). On his return to Iran in 1867 the King asked his ambassador to France, Hassan-Ali Garrussi, to hire a French musician to reorganize his military orchestras along Western European lines. Adolphe Niel, then France's Defence Minister, selected Lemaire to take up the post.

Once in Iran, Lemaire procured western instruments and organized the training of military musicians at the Dar ul-Funun, where his students included was Darvish Khan, and Gholam Reza Minbashian (Salar Mo'azez), a leading pioneer of Western classical music in Iran, as well as his son Nasrollah Minbashian.  At the request of the King he also composed the first Iranian national anthem and other military pieces. Lemaire was to spend the rest of his life in Iran but sent piano arrangements of classical Persian music back to Paris where the vogue for orientalism made them popular. In November 1906, three months before his death, he became the first Worshipful Master of the Réveil de l'Iran, the first regularly affiliated Masonic Lodge to operate in Iran. Lemaire died in Tehran at the age of 65.

Mirza Ali-Akbar Khan Naqqashbashi's translations of Lemaire's lessons into Persian were the country's first introduction to European music. The music department where he taught later became an independent music college providing training in Western martial music.

References
Notes

Sources
Algar, Hamid (2000). "Freemasonry ii. In the Qajar Period". Encyclopædia Iranica
Daniel, Elton L. and Mahdī, Alī Akbar (2006). Culture and Customs of Iran. Greenwood Publishing Group. ISBN 

Le Ménestrel (2 August 1885). "Nouvelles Diverses". Vol 51, p. 279
Wright, Owen (2009). Touraj Kiaras and Persian Classical Music: An Analytical Perspective. Ashgate Publishing. ,

French expatriates in Iran
19th-century French composers
People from Tehran
People from Aire-sur-la-Lys
1842 births
1907 deaths
French Republican Guard Band musicians
Iranian Freemasons
Burials at Doulab Cemetery